Ewelina Lukaszewska (born Ewelina Malgorzata Lukaszewska in 1987) is a Polish film director, model and actress, who appeared in the films Haunted Poland, Aleksandr's Price and Who's There?.

Film career

Lukaszewska has acted on a couple successful independent films, including, Who's There? and Haunted Poland which is due for release in 2012. Who's There? has received good critics. Lukaszewska is in pre-production for The App Killer.

On the summer of 2011, Lukaszewska gained more recognition as an actress for her performance in Haunted Poland.

Lukaszewska is currently rumored to portray Vikki in the film Machete Kills directed by Robert Rodriguez and Veronika in The App Killer directed by Pau Masó.

Filmography

Films

2011 Who's There?
2012 Haunted Poland
2012 Simple Moves
2012 The App Killer
2013 Machete Kills

Awards and nominations

In October 2011, Haunted Poland won "Best Movie/Documentary/Video/Script featuring  Religiosus/Supernatural theme" on the American International Film Festival (AIFF2010.com).

References

External links 
  
 

1987 births
Living people
Polish film actresses
Polish female models
21st-century Polish actresses
People from Włocławek